Ramaz Zoidze (born 13 February 1996) is a Georgian Greco-Roman wrestler. He won one of the bronze medals in the 67 kg event at the 2021 World Wrestling Championships held in Oslo, Norway. He also represented Georgia at the 2020 Summer Olympics held in Tokyo, Japan.

Career 

In 2018, he won the gold medal in the men's 72 kg event at the European U23 Wrestling Championship held in Istanbul, Turkey. In the same year, he won the silver medal in his event at the 2018 World U23 Wrestling Championship held in Bucharest, Romania.

In 2019, he was eliminated in his first match in the 72 kg event at the European Wrestling Championships held in Bucharest, Romania.

In March 2021, he qualified at the European Qualification Tournament to compete at the 2020 Summer Olympics in Tokyo, Japan. At the Olympics, he lost his bronze medal match in the 67 kg event.

References

External links 
 

Living people
Place of birth missing (living people)
Male sport wrestlers from Georgia (country)
Wrestlers at the 2020 Summer Olympics
1996 births
World Wrestling Championships medalists
Olympic wrestlers of Georgia (country)
21st-century people from Georgia (country)